This is a list of events in British radio during 1980.

Events

January
2 January – BBC Radio 3 launches a new, extended teatime programme Mainly for Pleasure. The two-hour long programme replaces the much shorter Homeward Bound.
13 January – Forces request programme Family Favourites is broadcast on BBC Radio 2 for the final time.

February
BBC Radio Wales launches the first of two permanent community opt-out stations, Radio Deeside, after successful community radio experiments in 1978. The reopening is in response to the closure of the Shotton steelworks.

March
 19–20 March – , the ship from which the pirate radio station Radio Caroline is broadcast, runs aground and sinks off the Thames Estuary.
 31 March – BBC Radio 1's broadcast hours are cut back. The station starts broadcasting on weekdays an hour later and Saturday evening programming ends. The station simulcasts BBC Radio 2 during this additional downtime although by the end of the year Radio 1 has stopped broadcasting Radio 2 through the night.

April
11 April – CBC in Cardiff becomes the first of the second tranche of Independent Local Radio stations to start broadcasting. It is the first new ILR station since 1976.

May
30 May – The final edition of soap opera Waggoners' Walk is broadcast on BBC Radio 2.

June
No events.

July
No events.

August
No events.

September
September – Due to the continued expansion of BBC Local Radio, the regional news bulletins, broadcast in England four times a day Monday to Saturday on BBC Radio 4, end, apart from in the south west which is the sole part of England which still does not have any BBC local service.

October
18 October – Radio Tay begins broadcasting to the Dundee area from the Angus transmitter.

November
14 November – Radio Tay begins broadcasting to the Perth area.

December
 1 December – BBC Scotland carries out a one-week experiment in breakfast television. It is a simulcast of BBC Radio Scotland's breakfast show Good Morning Scotland.
 6 December – Andy Peebles records an in-depth interview with John Lennon in New York City for BBC Radio 1, two days before Lennon's murder.

Station debuts
February – BBC Radio Deeside
11 April – CBC (Cardiff Broadcasting Company)
23 May – Mercia Sound
10 July – Hereward Radio
11 September – BBC Radio Norfolk
15 September – 2CR (Two Counties Radio)
17 October – Radio Tay
23 October – Severn Sound
7 November – DevonAir Radio
11 November – BBC Radio Lincolnshire

Closing this year

Programme debuts
 8 April – Radio Active on BBC Radio 4 (1980–1987)
 25 November – Hordes of the Things on BBC Radio 4 (1980)

Continuing radio programmes

1940s
 Sunday Half Hour (1940–2018)
 Desert Island Discs (1942–Present)
 Down Your Way (1946–1992)
 Letter from America (1946–2004)
 Woman's Hour (1946–Present)
 A Book at Bedtime (1949–Present)

1950s
 The Archers (1950–Present)
 The Today Programme (1957–Present)
 Sing Something Simple (1959–2001)
 Your Hundred Best Tunes (1959–2007)

1960s
 Farming Today (1960–Present)
 In Touch (1961–Present)
 The World at One (1965–Present)
 The Official Chart (1967–Present)
 Just a Minute (1967–Present)
 The Living World (1968–Present)
 The Organist Entertains (1969–2018)

1970s
 PM (1970–Present)
 Start the Week (1970–Present)
 Week Ending (1970–1998)
 You and Yours (1970–Present)
 I'm Sorry I Haven't a Clue (1972–Present)
 Good Morning Scotland (1973–Present)
 Kaleidoscope (1973–1998)
 Newsbeat (1973–Present)
 The News Huddlines (1975–2001)
 File on 4 (1977–Present)
 Money Box (1977–Present)
 The News Quiz (1977–Present)
 Breakaway (1979–1998)
 Feedback (1979–Present)
 The Food Programme (1979–Present)
 Science in Action (1979–Present)

Ending this year
 13 January – Family Favourites (1945–1980)
 30 May – Waggoners' Walk (1969–1980)
 15 November – The Burkiss Way (1976–1980)

Births
6 February – Tom Ravenscroft, radio DJ
28 February – Katy Wix, Welsh comedy actress
7 May – Kate Lawler, reality TV personality, DJ and model
3 June – Rickie Haywood-Williams, radio DJ and TV presenter
4 June – Nii Odartei Evans, radio announcer and voice actor
30 July – Melvin Odoom, radio DJ and TV presenter/comedian
3 November – Elis James, Welsh comedian
Sara Mohr-Pietsch, classical music presenter
Helen Zaltzman, podcaster, broadcaster and scriptwriter

Deaths
9 February – Renée Houston, actress (The Clitheroe Kid) (born 1902)
26 April – Dame Cicely Courtneidge, actress (Discord in Three Flats) (born 1893)
23 June – John Laurie, actor (The Man Born to Be King) (born 1897)
24 July – Peter Sellers, actor, comedian and radio personality (born 1925)
22 August – Norman Shelley, actor (born 1903)
6 October – Hattie Jacques, actress (Educating Archie, Hancock's Half Hour) (born 1922)
19 October – D. G. Bridson, radio producer and author (born 1910)
20 October – Isobel Barnett, broadcasting personality (born 1918; suicide)
8 December – Charles Parker, documentary producer (born 1919)

See also 
 1980 in British music
 1980 in British television
 1980 in the United Kingdom
 List of British films of 1980

References

Radio
British Radio, 1980 In
Years in British radio